Christel Augenstein (born 15 July 1949 in Erfurt, Germany) is a member of the Free Democratic Party. From 2001 until 23 July 2009 she was the mayor of Pforzheim, Germany, making her the city's first woman mayor. When the city of Pforzheim had already been in a bad financial position she took over the mayor's office from Joachim Becker (SPD) and tried her best to maneuver out. Becker was the ruling mayor of Pforzheim from 1985 until 2000.

The current major is Peter Boch of the Christian Democratic Union of Germany.

References

Free Democratic Party (Germany) politicians
Living people
1949 births
Women mayors of places in Germany
Politicians from Erfurt
21st-century German women politicians
Mayors of places in Baden-Württemberg